St Mary's Church, Tutbury, is a Grade I listed parish church in the Church of England in Tutbury, Staffordshire.

History
The West front of the church, the oldest surviving part of the building, is dated from around 1160 - 1170. For centuries the church was used by the monks of Tutbury Priory, as well as the being the parish church of Tutbury. However, the monastery appears to have been founded slightly later than the church.

Most of the nave was rebuilt in the 13th century.
At the Reformation the eastern part of the church, which served the monastic community, was demolished along with the priory buildings.
The South tower appears to be a 16th-century addition. The north aisle is an addition of 1820-2 by Joseph B H Bennett.
The chancel and sanctuary were replaced in 1866 by George Edmund Street funded by Sir Oswald Mosley (4th baronet and grandfather of the fascist politician).

Memorials

Indoors, the church has a memorial to George Robinson (d. 1837) by Joseph Hall of Derby.

The churchyard contains the war graves of seven Commonwealth service personnel, five from World War I and two from World War II.

Bells

The tower contains a ring of eight bells, with four dating from 1699. The tenor weighs a little over 10 cwt.

Organ

The church has an organ by Charles Lloyd, which was rebuilt in the 1930s. A specification of the organ can be found on the National Pipe Organ Register.

Picture Gallery

See also
Grade I listed buildings in Staffordshire
Listed buildings in Tutbury

References

Church of England church buildings in Staffordshire
English churches with Norman architecture
Grade I listed churches in Staffordshire